The Pony Express Terminal, also known as the B. F. Hastings Bank Building, is a historic commercial building at 1000 2nd Street in Sacramento, California. Built in 1852, it was the western endpoint of the Pony Express from 1860 to 1861, the period of the service's operation.  It was declared a National Historic Landmark in 1966. It now houses a museum dedicated to the history of Wells Fargo, and is part of Old Sacramento State Historic Park, itself a National Historic Landmark District.

Description
The B.F. Hastings Bank Building is located in Sacramento's historic downtown area, at the southwest corner of 2nd and J Streets.  It is an architecturally undistinguished two-story brick structure, presenting four bays to J Street and nine to 2nd Street.  A single-story canopy extends across the sidewalk in front of both facades, supported by simple square posts.  A metal staircase rises in the middle of the 2nd Street facade to an entrance on the second floor.

History
The building was constructed in 1852. The building was also the first location of the California Supreme Court.

The building is now home to one of two museums about the history of Wells Fargo in Sacramento.  This location features a re-created 19th-century Wells Fargo Express Company office, artifacts of company history and the California Gold Rush era, and exhibits about the company's role in California Gold Rush commerce.  (The other Wells Fargo History Museum in Sacramento is located in the Wells Fargo Center.)

See also
History of Sacramento, California
Old Sacramento State Historic Park
California Historical Landmarks in Sacramento County, California
List of National Historic Landmarks in California
National Register of Historic Places listings in Sacramento County, California
Index: Historic districts in California

References

External links

 Wells Fargo History Museums – Sacramento

Pony Express
Buildings and structures in Sacramento, California
Commercial buildings completed in 1852
Commercial buildings on the National Register of Historic Places in California
Transportation buildings and structures on the National Register of Historic Places in California
Historic American Buildings Survey in California
National Register of Historic Places in Sacramento, California
National Historic Landmarks in California
1852 in California
Museums in Sacramento, California
Old Sacramento State Historic Park
Individually listed contributing properties to historic districts on the National Register in California
Road transportation buildings and structures on the National Register of Historic Places
1852 establishments in California